Damita Jo may refer to:

Damita Jo (album), a 2004 album by Janet Jackson and her middle name
"Damita Jo", a song from the album above
Damita Jo DeBlanc (1930–1998), aka Damita Jo, American actress, comedian, and singer
Damita Jo Freeman , an American dancer and actress, who started her career on the TV show Soul Train.